Sukošan is a village and a municipality in Zadar County, Croatia. It is located along the Adriatic tourism road between Zadar and Biograd na Moru.

Population
In the 2011 Croatian census, there were a total of 4,583 inhabitants in the municipality, in the following settlements:
 Debeljak, population 919
 Glavica, population 185
 Gorica, population 671
 Sukošan, population 2,808

The majority of the population are Croats.

Geography
Sukošan is a holiday resort, with a spacious and cultivated long coastline, numerous coves and clean clear sea.

Situated in a bay, Sukošan has few sand beaches. The town itself offers nice walks through the traditional narrow alleys.

Known as a nautical center, Sukošan is a site of Zlatna luka Marina, the Tustica Nature Complex, pebble beaches, camping sites, distinguished buildings, olive groves, and vineyards.

Culture
Sukošan cherishes the old customs. They are linked to the feast of St. Kasijan, the patron saint of Sukosan (13 August). The Nights of Sukosan is another event offering entertainment. During the carnival season, "luzari", masques typical only of Sukosan, represent a special attraction.

Due to its numerous restaurants and taverns, Sukošan is known as a place of drinking wine and singing.

History
The parish church of St. Kasijan, erected probably in the eleventh century (fragments with pleter motifs - interlacery ornamentation), assumed its present aspect in the seventeenth century. It tends to be open for special occasions, such as August thirteenth, the feast of St Kasijan.

A small church from the seventeenth century rises on the graveyard. Fragments with "pleter" (interlacery ornaments) are incorporated in its door-posts and on the front.

The ruins of the fifteenth-century summer villa of the archbishops of Zadar can be seen on an islet in the bay.  The earth utilized to form the base of the villa was dredged from the neighborhood Punta, forming a festering tidal pool, known as Lake Sukošan, or Sukošan Jezero.

The ruins of the mediaeval fortress erected by the counts of Bribir rise on Cape Bribircina.

Economy
Chief occupations include farming, viniculture, olive growing, fruit growing and tourism.

Food
In Sukošan, there is a large variety of restaurants. Seafood, such as fried calamari and mussels, is one of the most common meals in the village.

References

External links
 Sukosan Tourist Office
 Sukosan
 About Sukosan

Municipalities of Croatia
Populated coastal places in Croatia
Populated places in Zadar County